Lake Vozhe, also known as Lake Charondskoye, is a lake in the northern part of Vologda Oblast in Russia. Lake Vozhe drains through the Svid into Lake Lacha, from which the Onega flows out. The lake is located on a flatland and its shores are low-lying and swampy. The biggest swamp, the Charonda Swamp, is located to the southeast of the lake. Around twenty rivers flow into Lake Vozhe, including the Vozhega and the Modlona. The lake freezes up in October - November (some parts freeze to the very bottom) and stays icebound until May.

Administratively, the lake is divided between Kirillovsky District (west) and Vozhegodsky District (east) of Vologda Oblast. The northern shore belongs to Kargopolsky and Konoshsky District of Arkhangelsk Oblast, but the boundary between the oblasts is drawn such that the whole area of the lake is in Vologda Oblast. In terms of the area, Lake Vozhe is the third natural lake of Vologda Oblast (behind Lake Onega and Lake Beloye and just ahead of Lake Kubenskoye) and the fourth lake (also behind the Rybinsk Reservoir).

Historically, Lake Vozhe was on the trading route connecting the basings of the Volga and the Onega via the Sheksna.

There is one big island on the lake, Spassky Island. On the island, ruins of the former monastery are located.

The only inhabited locality on the lakeshore is the village of Charonda which is a former trading settlement founded in the 13th century, currently having the population under ten and almost deserted. Charonda does not have all-seasonal land connections. Formerly, the village of Vasilyevskaya was located on the northern lakeshore. It had a railway station, Svid station, on the railway connecting the settlement of Yertsevo and the village of Sovza, located west of the lake. In Sovza, a number of prison camps were operating, and the railroad was used to transport timber. In 2006, the prison camps were closed, Sovza was abolished, and the railway was demolished. The village of Vasilyevskaya currently has no permanent population.

References

Lakes of Vologda Oblast
LVozhe